Gerd Jüttemann (born 7 December 1933) is a German psychologist. He is the originator of the "Komparative Kasuistik" (Comparative Casuistics), a method widely applied in qualitative psychological research and in other social sciences within Europe.

Life 

Jüttemann studied psychology at the universities in Cologne, Bonn, Innsbruck and Kiel. 1974 he was appointed as professor at the Technical University of Berlin, where he taught the disciplines personality psychology, clinical psychology, psychodiagnostics and methodology.

Scientific work 

Jüttemann focuses on biographical research (especially the self determined development of personality, what he calls "autogeny"),  historical psychology, personality psychology and qualitative methods (Comparative Casuistics). He is coeditor of the journals "Journal für Psychologie" and "Psychologie und Geschichte" (Psychology and History) as well as of the book series "Philosophie und Psychologie im Dialog" (Philosophy and Psychology in Dialog, published by Vandenhoeck & Ruprecht) und "Psychologie und Beruf" (Psychology and Career, Vandenhoeck & Ruprecht).

Journal article 

 Komparative Kasuistik als Strategie Psychologischer Forschung. Zeitschrift für Klinische Psychologie und Psychotherapie 29, 1981, S. 101-118. (Foundation of his "Comparative Casuistics").

Books 

 Individuelle und soziale Regeln des Handelns. Gerd Jüttemann (Hrsg.). 1991. Asanger-Verlag Kröning. 
 Individuum und Geschichte. M. Sonntag, G. Jüttemann (Hrsg.). 1993. Asanger-Verlag Kröning. 
 Persönlichkeitspsychologie. Gerd Jüttemann. 1995. Asanger-Verlag Kröning.

References

External links 
 Gerd Jüttemann's homepage 
 

1933 births
Living people
German psychologists
Academic staff of the Technical University of Berlin